Secret Service was a Polish monthly magazine for gaming and consoles, published by ProScript publishing house from 1993 to 2001. The first issue of the magazine was released on March 16, 1993. The founders of the magazine were Marcin Przasnyski and Waldemar Nowak, who had previously worked for Top Secret. The magazine was discontinued after 95 issues but was briefly reactivated in 2014 and published 2 issues.

History
Secret Service was the first magazine in Poland to have a CD.

The last issue of Secret Service (No. 95) was released in November 2001 and on December 31, 2001, a message appeared on the magazine's official website, notifying that the magazine was being suspended. A few days later the staff stated that the information was a result of their server being hacked. They stated that the only reason for the "confusion" was technical problems. Issue 96 (12/2001) was completed and sent to the printers, but was never printed.

Attempts to reactivate the magazine
In July 2002, a group of Secret Service readers established Electronic magazine SS-NG which transformed itself from a follower of the tradition of Secret Service to a standalone "E-zine". On August 29, the 2005 editor-in-chief of SS-NG informed the readers of e-zine about the end of activities and publications of the magazine.

On June 24, 2014, reactivation of Secret Service was announced. On July 15, a crowdfunding campaign began with the goal of zl 93,000 being reached in just 20 hours. Within a month, 284,200 PLN was collected. The first reactivated issue (97) was published on 30 September 2014 with 50,000 copies. The second and last issue appeared at the beginning of December. The reason for the suspension was a dispute between the publisher and the owner of the rights to the title. In its place, the publisher announced the release of a new monthly magazine, Pixel, whose first issue went on sale in late January 2015.

References

External links 
 Archived Secret Service magazines on the Internet Archive

1993 establishments in Poland
2001 disestablishments in Poland
Defunct computer magazines
Defunct magazines published in Poland
Home computer magazines
Magazines established in 1993
Magazines disestablished in 2001
Magazines published in Warsaw
Monthly magazines published in Poland
Polish-language magazines
Video game magazines published in Poland